Always Together is a 1947 American comedy film directed by Frederick de Cordova and written by I. A. L. Diamond, Henry Ephron and Phoebe Ephron. The film stars Robert Hutton, Joyce Reynolds, Cecil Kellaway, Ernest Truex, Don McGuire and Ransom M. Sherman. The film was released by Warner Bros. on December 10, 1947.

Plot
A millionaire on his deathbed leaves a million dollars to Jane Barker, a film addict who believes life is like the movies.  Jane gets married without telling her new husband about the inheritance. The millionaire gets better and wants his million dollars back. Throughout the film Jane dreams her experiences are taking place in movies with real movie stars.

Cast 
 Robert Hutton as Donn Masters
 Joyce Reynolds as Jane Barker
 Cecil Kellaway as Jonathan Turner
 Ernest Truex as Mr. Timothy J. Bull
 Don McGuire as McIntyre
 Ransom M. Sherman as Judge 
 Douglas Kennedy as Doberman

Reception
Bosley Crowther of The New York Times said, "Not that money lacks advantages, and not that the basic idea behind this silly little picture couldn't be brightly kicked around. But that hasn't been done in the hodge-podge of farcical situations here contrived, nor in the witless and unbeguiling acting of the juvenile principals. Joyce Reynolds is dewishly sophomoric as the girl who thinks money is a curse (even after she is given $1,000,000 by a dying millionaire) and Robert Hutton is merely collar-addled as her contrary-minded spouse. Against such childish opposition, Cecil Kellaway and Ernest Truex, two old hands at ripping up farce scripts and scenery, pretty well have their reckless ways. Some of their clowning is enlivening but for the most part it is forced and dull. The Warners will have to do much better in arguing for money than this."

References

External links 
 
 
 
 

1947 films
1940s English-language films
Warner Bros. films
American comedy films
1947 comedy films
Films directed by Frederick de Cordova
American black-and-white films
1940s American films